Kampong Tungku is a village in Brunei-Muara District, Brunei, about  from the capital Bandar Seri Begawan. The population was 1,689 in 2016. It is one of the villages within Mukim Gadong 'A'. The postcode is BE2119.

Geography 

As a village subdivision, it borders Kampong Rimba to the north-east; Area 1 and Area 5 of RPN Kampong Rimba, and STKRJ Kampong Rimba to the east; Area 1 and Area 2 of STKRJ Kampong Tungku to the south-east; Kampong Katok and STKRJ Kampong Katok 'A' to the south; and Kampong Peninjau to the west. It also borders the South China Sea to the north.

Administration 
Kampong Tungku shares a village head with the neighbouring village Kampong Katok.

Infrastructures

Roads 
Road access to the village is served by Jalan Tungku from the south-east, and Jalan Rakyat Jati Rimba and the Tungku–Jerudong Highway from the north. Jalan Tungku is the main road in the settlement which traverses the area in the north-west–south-east direction. Jalan Rakyat Jati Rimba and the Tungku–Jerudong Highway terminate in Tungku at a roundabout junction with Jalan Tungku north of the settlement.

Education 
The village's government primary school is Tungku Primary School. It also shares grounds with Tungku Religious School, the village's government school for the country's Islamic religious primary education.

The following educational institutions are located within the village's administrative boundary:
 University of Brunei Darussalam (UBD), the country's national university
 University of Technology Brunei (UTB), the country's institute of technology
 Jerudong International School, one of the few international schools in the country and offers British curriculum
 The Mechanical Campus of the Institute of Brunei Technical Education (IBTE)

Religion 
Pengiran Muda Abdul Malik Mosque is the village mosque, which is also shared with the residents of Kampong Katok. It was inaugurated on 27 July 2012 by Sultan Hassanal Bolkiah, the Sultan of Brunei. The mosque has a capacity for 1,000 worshippers. It is named after Prince Abdul Malik, a son of Sultan Hassanal Bolkiah with the queen consort Queen Saleha.

References 

Tungku